Jim Lightcap is a pioneering American gasser drag racer.

Driving a GMC-powered Model A, he won NHRA's C/SR (C/Street; gas) national title at Detroit Dragway  in 1960.

The next year, he won a second NHRA C/Street national title, at Indianapolis.

References

Sources
Davis, Larry. Gasser Wars.  North Branch, MN:  Cartech, 2003, pp. 181–2.

Dragster drivers
American racing drivers